Stefan Stannarius (born 20 October 1961 in Gräfenthal, Bezirk Suhl) was an East German ski jumper who competed from 1982 to 1984. He finished fourth in the individual normal hill event at the 1984 Winter Olympics in Sarajevo.

Stannarius's best career finish was third in an individual large hill event in Switzerland in 1983.

External links

1961 births
Living people
People from Saalfeld-Rudolstadt
People from Bezirk Suhl
German male ski jumpers
Sportspeople from Thuringia
Olympic ski jumpers of East Germany
Ski jumpers at the 1984 Winter Olympics